Marcin Dzieński (born 22 January 1993) is a Polish speed climber from Tarnów.
He is multiple World and European Championships medalist and 2016 World Champion, the first Polish climber to achieve that title.

He debuted in Speed Climbing World Championships in 2011. Since 2018, he's also competing in Bouldering World Championships and Worldcup.

See also
List of grade milestones in rock climbing
History of rock climbing
Rankings of most career IFSC gold medals

References 

1993 births
Living people
Competitors at the 2017 World Games
Competitors at the 2022 World Games
20th-century Polish people
21st-century Polish people
Sportspeople from Tarnów
Polish rock climbers
IFSC Climbing World Championships medalists
IFSC Climbing World Cup overall medalists
Speed climbers